There have been nine baronetcies held by people with the surname Nugent, four in the Baronetage of Ireland and five in the Baronetage of the United Kingdom. Six of the creations are extinct, while three are extant.

The Nugent Baronetcy, of Moyrath in the County of Westmeath, was created in the Baronetage of Ireland on 14 January 1622 for Thomas Nugent.

The Nugent Baronetcy, of Donore in the County of Westmeath, was created in the Baronetage of Ireland on 18 July 1768 for James Nugent, with remainder to his younger brother Peter. On the latter's death in 1799 the title became extinct. However, their great-nephew was created a Baronet in 1831 (see below).

The Nugent Baronetcy, of Dysery in the County of Westmeath, was created in the Baronetage of Ireland on 3 December 1782 for Nicholas Nugent.

The O'Reilly, later Nugent Baronetcy, of Ballinlough in the County of Westmeath, was created in the Baronetage of Ireland on 23 July 1795 for Hugh O'Reilly. In 1812, on the death of his maternal uncle John Nugent, he assumed by Royal licence the surname of Nugent. His younger brother Andrew O'Reilly was a General der Kavallerie in the Austrian Army and a Graf (Count) of the Austrian Empire. Their sister Margaret married Richard Talbot and was, as a widow, created Baroness Talbot of Malahide in 1831. The third Baronet was Chamberlain to the Emperor of Austria and was also created a Count of the Austrian Empire. The Austrian statesman and soldier Laval Graf Nugent von Westmeath also belonged to this family. The family seat is Ballinlough Castle, Clonmellon, County Westmeath.

The Nugent Baronetcy, of Waddesdon in the County of Berks, was created in the Baronetage of the United Kingdom on 28 November 1806 for Field Marshal Sir George Nugent. He was the illegitimate son of the Honourable Edmund Nugent, only son of The 1st Earl Nugent (see Earl Nugent). The 1st Baron Nugent was the younger brother of the fourth Baronet.

The Humble, later Nugent Baronetcy, of Cloncoskoran in the County of Waterford, was created in the Baronetage of the United Kingdom on 30 September 1831 for John Nugent Humble. The third Baronet used the surname of Nugent only. On his death in 1929 the title became extinct.

The Nugent Baronetcy, of Donore in the County of Westmeath, was created in the Baronetage of the United Kingdom on 30 September 1831 for Percy FitzGerald Nugent. He was the son of Thomas FitzGerald, nephew of the first and second Baronets of the 1768 creation, who succeeded to the Donore estates and who assumed (without Royal licence) the surname of Nugent in lieu of FitzGerald. The first Baronet sat as Member of Parliament for Westmeath and the fourth Baronet represented Westmeath South in the House of Commons and was a Senator of the Irish Free State.

The Nugent Baronetcy, of Dunsfold in the County of Surrey, was created in the Baronetage of the United Kingdom on 27 January 1960 for George Richard Hodges Nugent. In 1966 he was given a life peerage as Baron Nugent of Guildford, of Dunsfold in the County of Surrey. Both titles became extinct on his death in 1994.

The Nugent Baronetcy, of Portaferry in the County of Down, was created in the Baronetage of the United Kingdom on 4 July 1961 for Roland Thomas Nugent. He notably served as Lord Lieutenant of County Down. The title became extinct on his death in 1962.

Nugent Baronets, of Moyrath (1622)
Sir Thomas Nugent, 1st Baronet (died )
Sir Robert Nugent, 2nd Baronet (died 1675)
Sir Thomas Nugent, 3rd Baronet (died )

Nugent Baronets, of Donore (1768)
Sir James Nugent, 1st Baronet (1730–1794)
Sir Peter Nugent, 2nd Baronet (1745–1799)
Sir Percy Thomas Nugent, 3rd Baronet (1861–1896)
Sir Walter Richard Nugent, 4th Baronet (1865–1955)
Sir Peter Walter James Nugent, 5th Baronet (1920–2002)
Sir Walter Richard Middleton Nugent, 6th Baronet (1947–)

Nugent Baronets, of Dysery (1782)
Sir Nicholas Nugent, 1st Baronet (died )

O'Reilly, later Nugent Baronets, of Ballinlough (1795)
Sir Hugh O'Reilly, later Nugent, 1st Baronet
Sir James Nugent, 2nd Baronet (died 1843)
Sir John Hugh Nugent, 3rd Baronet (1800–1859)
Sir Hugh Joseph Nugent, 4th Baronet (1845–1863)
Sir Charles Nugent, 5th Baronet (1847–1927)
Sir Hugh Charles Nugent, 6th Baronet (1904–1983)
Sir John Edwin Lavallin Nugent, 7th Baronet (1933–2009)
Sir Nicholas Myles John Nugent, 8th Baronet (born 1967)

The heir presumptive is the present holder's first cousin Charles Rupert Nugent (born 1962).
The heir presumptive's heir apparent is his son Hugh Frederick Nugent (born 1995).

Nugent Baronets, of Waddesdon (1806)
Field Marshal Sir George Nugent, 1st Baronet, GCB, (1757–1849)
Sir George Edmund Nugent, 2nd Baronet (1802–1892)
Sir Edmund Charles Nugent, 3rd Baronet (1839–1928)
Sir (George) Guy Bulwer Nugent, 4th Baronet (1892–1970)
Sir Robin George Colborne Nugent, 5th Baronet (1925–2006)
Sir Christopher George Ridley Nugent, 6th Baronet (born 1949)

The heir apparent the present holder's son Terence Nugent (born 1986).

Humble, later Nugent Baronets, of Cloncoskoran (1831)
Sir John Nugent Humble, 1st Baronet (1785–1834)
Sir John Nugent Humble, 2nd Baronet (1818–1886)
Sir John Nugent Nugent, 3rd Baronet (1849–1929) had issue:
Joane Frances Clare

Nugent Baronets, of Donore (1831)
Sir Percy Fitzgerald Nugent, 1st Baronet (1797–1874)
Sir Walter George Nugent, 2nd Baronet (1827–1893)
Sir Percy Thomas Nugent, 3rd Baronet (1861–1896)
Sir Walter Richard Nugent, 4th Baronet (1865–1955)
Sir Peter Walter James Nugent, 5th Baronet (1920–2002)
Sir Walter Richard Middleton Nugent, 6th Baronet (born 1947)

The heir presumptive is the present holder's brother Andrew Robert Nugent (born 1951).

Nugent Baronets, of Dunsfold (1960)
Sir George Richard Hodges Nugent, 1st Baronet (1907–1994) (created Baron Nugent of Guildford in 1966)

Nugent Baronets, of Portaferry (1961)
Sir Roland Thomas Nugent, 1st Baronet (1886–1962)

References
Kidd, Charles, Williamson, David (editors). Debrett's Peerage and Baronetage (1990 edition). New York: St Martin's Press, 1990, 

Baronetcies in the Baronetage of Ireland
Baronetcies in the Baronetage of the United Kingdom
Extinct baronetcies in the Baronetage of Ireland
Extinct baronetcies in the Baronetage of the United Kingdom
1622 establishments in Ireland
1806 establishments in the United Kingdom